Jaltomata cuyasensis is a plant species native to Peru. It grows on rocky hillsides at elevations less than 1800 m.

Jaltomata cuyasensis is a shrub up to 150 cm tall. Flowers are pale green with green and lavender markings. Fruits are bright orange at maturity.

References

cuyasensis
Flora of Peru